David Lebuser (born September 12, 1986, in Frankfurt (Oder), East Germany) is German extreme wheelchair athlete. He was the first professional wheelchair skater in Germany. Apart from riding WCMX, which is adapted from skateboarding and BMX, he also hosts WCMX workshops for other wheelchair users in Germany.  At the age of 21, he became paralysed from the waist down (L3) after he fell into a stairwell.

Early life and education

Lebuser grew up in Frankfurt (Oder) in Brandenburg, Germany. After primary education, he went to a sports school in Frankfurt (Oder) and graduated from a secondary school in 2003. He worked as a painter and later attended sixth form. Before moving to Berlin in 2010, he worked as a customer consultant.  He did several internships since, including in Helsinki, Finland.

Accident and rehabilitation

On 28 August 2008, Lebuser broke his back after falling into a stairwell, two floors down. He tried to slide down a handrail after a friend's birthday. He has a spinal cord injury from the waist down (first lumbar vertebra fracture). During his time at the hospital and his rehabilitation the 2008 Summer Paralympics in Beijing took place, so he soon realised that there was more to do than getting pushed around in a chair. While still in hospital a friend showed Lebuser a YouTube video of Aaron Fotheringham doing a wheelchair backflip, which inspired him to go to skate parks and start wheelchair skating. He also started playing wheelchair basketball soon after rehabilitation.

Professional life

Since 2012, Lebuser competes in the WCMX World Championships, also known as Life Rolls On "They Will Skate Again" in Venice, California every year. In 2013, he placed third in the WCMX division and fifth in all divisions. In 2012, he placed fifth. 2014 he won the category "Best Overall Run" in the wheelchair section.

In 2013, Lebuser started hosting WCMX workshops for other wheelchair users across Germany. There were no other wheelchair skaters in Germany apart from him before. He also created an action sports division at the German Wheelchair Sports Association (DRS).

Lebuser uses a customised WCMX chair from Jumper Equipamentos from Brazil for skating. The chair features four-wheel suspension and is more solid than everyday wheelchairs. This enables him to perform the same sorts of tricks that skateboarders and BMXers can do, as the suspension cushions his landings.

References

External links
David's Facebook Page
Action sports division at the German Wheelchair Sport Association

1986 births
Living people
Sportspeople from Frankfurt (Oder)
German disabled sportspeople